The 2020 Memphis Tigers football team represented the University of Memphis in the 2020 NCAA Division I FBS football season. The Tigers played their home games at Liberty Bowl Memorial Stadium in Memphis, Tennessee, and competed in the American Athletic Conference. They were led by first-year head coach Ryan Silverfield.

Schedule
Memphis had game scheduled against Purdue and UT Martin, which were canceled due to the COVID-19 pandemic. On September 12 the American announced that the Houston game scheduled for September 18 was postponed due to positive COVID-19 cases at Memphis. Subsequently, the scheduled game against UTSA on September 25 was also canceled due to ongoing cases at Memphis. The UTSA game was replaced with a game against Stephen F. Austin scheduled for November 21.

Schedule Source:

Rankings

Game summaries

Arkansas State

at SMU

UCF

Temple

at Cincinnati

South Florida

Stephen F. Austin

at Navy

at Tulane

Houston

vs. Florida Atlantic (Montgomery Bowl)

Players drafted into the NFL

References

Memphis
Memphis Tigers football seasons
Montgomery Bowl champion seasons
Memphis Tigers football